Natica rubromaculata is a species of predatory sea snail, a marine gastropod mollusk in the family Naticidae, the moon snails.

Description
The length of the shell attains 20.2 mm.

Distribution
This marine species occurs in the equatorial zone off Gabon

References

 Torigoe K. & Inaba A. (2011). Revision on the classification of Recent Naticidae. Bulletin of the Nishinomiya Shell Museum. 7: 133 + 15 pp., 4 pls

External links
 Smith, E.A. (1872) A list of species of shells from West Africa, with descriptions of those hitherto undescribed. Proceedings of the Zoological Society of London, 1871, 727–739, pl. 75

Naticidae
Gastropods described in 1872